Vertigo ventricosa, common name the five-tooth vertigo, is a species of minute air-breathing land snail, a terrestrial pulmonate gastropod mollusk in the family Vertiginidae, the whorl snails.

Description
(Original description) Animal: The dorsal and cephalic portions of body, and tentacles are jet black. The disk is long, narrow, rounded at extremity. The anterior portion of the disk is dark slate, becoming lighter towards caudal extremity. The tentacles are short and very bulbous. The base of the tentacles approximating. The cephalic lobes are conspicuous.

The buccal plate is wide, narrow, not produced in centre, but slightly curving at ends. The cutting edge is regularly waved.

Lingual formula of the radula: 98,-13-1-13 . The central and lateral plates are notched at the outer posterior corners. The central plate is square, having three small denticles. The blate is indented at the base of the central denticle, which is the largest. The lateral plates are tridentate, the inner denticle largest. The uncine is minutely notched.

The shell is umbilicate, ovate conic, smooth and polished. The apex is obtuse . The suture is deep. The shell contains four convex whorls. The aperture is semi-circular, with five teeth, one prominent on the parietal margin; two smaller on the columellar margin, and two prominent within, contracting the aperture at the base. The peristome is widely reflected, the right margin flexuose, within thickened and colored.

Distribution
This species occurs in Northeast America.

References

 Sterki, V. (1894). The land and fresh water Mollusca in the vicinity of New Philadelphia. A contribution to the natural history of Tuscarawas Co., Ohio. Beobachter Print, New Philadelphia, Ohio. 1-14.
 InvertEBase. (2018). Authority files of U.S. and Canadian land and freshwater mollusks developed for the InvertEBase (InvertEBase.org) project.

External links
 Pilsbry, H. A. (1899). Notes on a new northwest American land snails. Proceedings of the Academy of Natural Sciences of Philadelphia. 51(2): 314-315
  Baker, F. C. (1928). Description of new varieties of land and freshwater mollusks from Pleistocene deposits in Illinois. The Nautilus. 41(4): 132-137.

ventricosa
Gastropods described in 1865